Thomas Barber is the name of:

Politicians
Thomas Barber (fl. 1395), MP for Leominster
Thomas Barber (died 1439), MP for Stafford
Thomas Barber (fl. 1402-1407), MP for Reigate

Others
 Thomas Barber (1771–1843), painter and draughtsman; portrait of Christian Ignatius Latrobe
 Thomas P. Barber (1832–1932), English-born American architect
 Thomas Barber (judge) (born 1966), American federal judge
 Thomas Barber (musician) ( 1740 – c. 1810), English musician and Master of the Choristers of Chichester Cathedral (1794–1801)
 Sir Thomas Barber, 3rd Baronet (1876–1961), of the Barber baronets
 Sir Thomas Barber, 4th Baronet (born 1937), of the Barber baronets
 Thomas Barber (Big Brother) (born 1996), English Big Brother contestant
 Barber County, Kansas, named for Thomas Barber, an abolitionist

See also
Tom Barber (disambiguation)

Thomas Barbar (fl. 1587), English divine
Thomas Barbour (1884–1946), American herpetologist